Swanshurst School is a secondary school and sixth form for girls aged 11 to 19 years, located in Birmingham, England. Swanshurst is a leading edge school,

It is a community school administered by Birmingham City Council. Swanshurst offers GCSEs and BTECs as programmes of study for pupils, while students in the sixth form have the option to study from a range of A-Levels and further BTECs.

References

Community schools in Birmingham, West Midlands
Girls' schools in the West Midlands (county)
Secondary schools in Birmingham, West Midlands